The Qalqilya Governorate or Qalqiliya Governorate is an administrative area of Palestine in the northwestern West Bank. Its capital or muhfaza (seat) is the city of Qalqilya that borders the Green Line.

Localities

Municipalities
 Azzun
 Hableh
 Qalqilya
 Kafr Thulth

Towns and villages
 Azzun 'Atma
 Baqah
 Baqat al-Hatab
 Beit Amin
 Falamya
 Hajjah
 Immatain
 Islah
 Jayyous
 Jinsafut
 Jit
 Kafr Laqif
 Kafr Qaddum
 an Nabi Elyas
 Ras Atiya
 Sanniriya
 Fara'ata

References 

 
Governorates of the Palestinian National Authority in the West Bank